Kress may refer to:

Places 
Kress, Texas a city in north Texas
Kress (Columbus, Georgia), a National Register of Historic Places listing in Muscogee County, Georgia
 Kress, Virginia

Samuel Kress and his organizations 
Samuel H. Kress, a businessman, founder of the organizations in this section
S. H. Kress & Co., a former chain of "five and dime" stores in the United States
Tiendas Kress, the still-operating Puerto Rico subsidiary selling women's clothing
The Samuel H. Kress Foundation, which holds and disposes of his large art collection

People
 Eric Kress (born 1962), Danish cinematographer
Friedrich Freiherr Kress von Kressenstein (1870–1948), German general in World War I
Nancy Kress (born 1948), American science fiction writer
Nathan Kress (born 1992), American actor
Stephen W. Kress, founder of Project Puffin
Viktor Kress (born 1948), governor of Tomsk Oblast, Russia
W. John Kress (born 1951), American botanist
Wilhelm Kress (1836–1913), Austrian aviation pioneer

See also 
 List of S. H. Kress and Co. buildings
 Kress Corporation
 Kreß (disambiguation)